The First Olympics: Athens 1896 is a 1984 American television miniseries produced by Columbia Pictures Television for broadcast by the NBC network. This television miniseries tells the story of the founding of the modern Olympics by focusing on individuals in several countries and their preparations and eventual competition in Athens in 1896. The two-part mini-series originally aired in the United States on May 20, 1984.

Plot
The preparation and events leading up to the inaugural modern Olympic Games held in Athens, 1896. The movie examines the experience of competitors from different nations, but especially concentrates on the creation of the first American Olympic team and their trials in getting to the Olympics in Athens. The series ends with a voice over giving brief descriptions of the various historical individuals that took part.

Cast
 Louis Jourdan as Pierre de Coubertin, founder of the International Olympic Committee
 David Ogden Stiers as William Milligan Sloane, founder of the United States Olympic Committee
 Hunt Block as Robert Garrett, United States athlete 
 David Caruso as James Brendan Connolly, United States athlete 
 Alex Hyde-White as Arthur Blake, United States athlete 
 Hutton Cobb as Thomas Burke, United States athlete 
 Jason Connery as Thomas Curtis, United States athlete  
 Ian Morton as Ellery Harding Clark, United States athlete 
 William Armstrong as William Hoyt, United States athlete 
 Aaron Swartz as Herbert Jamison, United States athlete 
 Keith Edwards as Albert Tyler, United States athlete
 Terrance Conder as Sumner Paine, United States athlete 
 Peter Merrill as John Paine, United States athlete
 Matt Frewer as Francis Lane, United States athlete
 Robert Addie as Grantley Goulding, British athlete
 Benedict Taylor as Edwin Flack, Australian athlete
 Nicos Ziagos as Spiridon Louis, Greek athlete
 Edward Wiley as John Graham, American coach
 Angela Lansbury as Alice Garrett, Robert Garrett's mother
 Honor Blackman as Madam Ursula Schumann
 Gayle Hunnicutt as Mary Sloane
 Bill Travers as Harold Flack
 Virginia McKenna as Annabel Flack

Historical inaccuracies in the series

 Louis Jourdan was 63 when he played the role of Pierre de Coubertin, who was 33 in 1896. He was also considerably taller than Pierre de Coubertin.
 James Connolly is told by Coach Graham and the dean of students at Harvard that he and Arthur Blake will be volunteering for the new U.S. Olympic Team as punishment for fighting with each other. In reality, after Connolly was denied a leave of absence to compete in the Games, he dropped out and competed anyway.
 It is noted that Edwin Flack is from a family of butchers, and he would be interrupting his studies at Oxford University to compete in the Games. In reality, he was taking a month's holiday from his job as an accountant at the firm of Price, Waterhouse, and Company, which later bought out his family's firm.
 Three Greek flags are raised after the finish of the Marathon. However, it is not mentioned that the third Greek finisher, Spiridon Belokas, was later disqualified after he was found to have ridden part of the way in a carriage. Gyula Kellner of Hungary was elevated to third place.
 When athletes first competed in the Olympics, they only represented their clubs or their schools. They did not start participating on official national teams or marching in a Parade of Nations until the London Games of 1908. Also, the first team to appear in the (anachronistic) Parade at the opening ceremony of the Games is Australia, but the Commonwealth of Australia was not officially formed until 1901.
 Robert Garrett is incorrectly portrayed as being a participant in the marathon. Arthur Blake was the only American entrant in the event, and he did not finish.
 In an incident similar to the one with an oversized discus, Robert Garrett is seen trying to enter the shot put with an oversized shot put. In reality, unlike the incident with the discus (which is very well documented), there is no record of a similar incident with the shot put having taken place.
 James Connolly is portrayed as having emigrated to America from Ireland, but he was actually born in Boston in 1868; it was Connolly's parents who emigrated to America.
 Blake is shown placing second in the 800 meters in a thrilling finish, and Edwin Flack brings him onto the first place podium. In reality, Blake was actually second to Flack in the 1500 meters - which was decided in the last 100 meters - and didn't run the 800. The 800 meters silver medal went to Nándor Dáni of Hungary, with the actual winning margin being five meters.

Awards and nominations

Primetime Emmy Awards

Writers Guild of America, USA

Casting Society of America, USA

References

External links
 

1980s American television miniseries
Television series set in the 1890s
Olympics on United States television
Television shows set in Athens
NBC original programming
1984 American television series debuts
1984 American television series endings
Television series by Sony Pictures Television